Foothills Academy may refer to:
Foothills Academy (Alberta), in Calgary, Alberta, Canada
Foothills Academy (Arizona), in Scottsdale, Arizona
Foothills Academy (Colorado), in Wheat Ridge, Colorado
Foothills Academy (Kentucky), in Albany, Kentucky